Jonathan Hay may refer to:

Jonathan Hay (athlete) (born 1992), British distance runner
Jonathan Hay (footballer) (born 1979), Australian rules footballer
Jonathan Hay (publicist) (born 1973), American celebrity publicist and record producer

See also
John Hay (disambiguation)